Mons-en-Barœul is a commune in the Nord department in northern France.

It is a suburb of the city of Lille, and is adjacent to it on the northeast. The name Mons-en-Barœul means mount in the Barœul, the city is built on a slight hill; the Barœul was a former territory (see also Marcq-en-Barœul). Before the sixteenth century, little is known of this county, which was only rural. Plans of the eighteenth century show Mons-en-Barœul as a small village without a church, with farms scattered along the high road from Lille to Roubaix. It is a former dependency of Fives, a district which is now part of Lille.

Heraldry

Population

Notable people
Michel Butor, poet and novelist, was born in Mons-en-Barœul.

See also
Communes of the Nord department

References

External links

 Official website

Monsenbaroeul
French Flanders